Craddick is a surname. Notable people with the surname include:

 Tom Craddick (born 1943), member of the Texas House of Representatives
 Christi Craddick (born 1970), member of the Texas Railroad Commission and daughter of Tom Craddick

See also
 Cradick (disambiguation)
 Craddock (disambiguation)
 Cradock (disambiguation)